The Battles of the Loxahatchee occurred west of what is now Jupiter, Florida in January 1838 between the United States military and the Seminole Indians (including Black Seminoles). The First Battle of the Loxahatchee (Powell's Battle) occurred on January 15, involving a mixed Navy-Army unit under Lt. Levin M. Powell. The Second Battle of the Loxahatchee (Jesup's Battle) occurred on January 24 involving an army under Major General Thomas Jesup. The two battles were fought within a few miles of each other against the same group of Seminoles.

Background
After the American Revolutionary War, Spain regained control of Florida from Britain as part of the Treaty of Paris, and the Seminoles set up farms and acquired land grants from the Spanish. At the same time, because the state was in Spanish control, escaped slaves took advantage of the treaty and found refuge in Florida. These two developments pushed the U.S. to begin the First Seminole War (1817–1818) on the Florida-Georgia border, which pushed the Seminoles further south.

In May 1832, the Treaty of Payne's Landing required Indians to forfeit their land and move west within a three-year window. In 1835, the U.S. Army returned to Florida to enforce the treaty and found the Indians prepared to fight.

Battle name
The names of the two battles have not been historically consistent. Older sources sometimes erroneously refer to Powell's Battle as the Battle of Jupiter Inlet (including Guinn), probably because contemporary newspaper accounts described it as occurring "near" the inlet.

The modern name of both battles refers to the Loxahatchee River (not the modern community of Loxahatchee, Florida). "Loxahatchee" is an Anglicized version of the waterway's Seminole name, "Locha-hatchee" (turtle river). Historical spellings have varied, including Lockahatchee (Mahon) and Locha-Hatchie (Buker).

First Battle of the Loxahatchee (Powell's Battle)
Lieutenant Levin M. Powell led the Everglades Expeditionary Unit, a mixed Navy-Army force, up the Loxahatchee River on January 15, 1838, in search of Seminole villages. Powell's men captured a Seminole woman and ordered her to lead them to the nearest village.

Leaving 23 men to guard the boats, Powell divided his remaining men under Acting Lt. William P. McArthur (USN), Acting Lt. Horace N. Harrison (USN), and Lt. Henry W. Fowler (USA). After marching , they came under fire from Seminoles. Powell ordered his men to charge and the Seminoles fell back into a dense cypress swamp where they made a determined stand. Powell, McArthur, and Harrison were all wounded and naval surgeon Dr. Frederick Leitner killed. The loss of the officers caused most of Powell's force to fall back in disorder. Lt. Fowler was wounded as he attempted to cover the retreat. With all the other officers down, Joseph E. Johnston took charge and organized a successful retreat. The men and boats left after dark to return to Fort Pierce. One boat, containing gunpowder and alcohol, was accidentally left behind in the dark. After recovering a lost man initially thought to be killed, Powell reported his losses as 4 killed and 22 wounded.

Second Battle of the Loxahatchee (Jesup's Battle)
Notified that Powell had definitively located a group of Seminoles, Major General Thomas S. Jesup brought his army overland from Fort Pierce, passing west of the St. Lucie River and approaching the Seminole encampment from the west. Jesup had a force of about 1,500 men: 600 dragoons (2nd Dragoons under Col. William S. Harney), 400 artillery (part of the 3rd US Artillery under Colonel Lemuel Gates), 400 Tennessee Volunteers (under Major William Lauderdale), 100 Alabama Volunteers, and 35 Delaware Indian scouts.

On the afternoon of January 24, Jesup's scouts located the Seminoles in a dense hammock. Jesup's men dragoons and infantry attacked, with support from cannons and Congreve rockets. The Seminoles fell back across the Loxahatchee River and took up a second position on the east bank. Jesup attempted to lead the Tennessee Volunteers in a charge, but had his glasses shot off his face. Col. Harney led 15 dragoons across the river upstream of the Seminoles and flanked their position, causing them to retreat in scattered groups and ending the battle.

This engagement is considered the last true battle of the Second Seminole War.

Results
After the battle, Jesup's march marched east to what is now Pennock Point where they established Fort Jupiter. The general unsuccessfully petitioned the federal government to allow the Seminoles to remain in the Everglades and end the war.

William Lauderdale's Tennessee Volunteers subsequently marched south from Jupiter to New River where they established Fort Lauderdale.

Notable participants
Joseph E. Johnston was a volunteer at the First Battle of the Loxahatchee, having not yet been officially recommissioned in the Army. He claimed that there were "no less than 30 bullet holes" in his clothing, with one bullet cutting his scalp, leaving him with a scar. After receiving his commission as 1st Lieutenant on July 7, 1838, Johnston was given a brevet promotion to captain for his actions. He later became a Confederate general.

Thomas S. Jesup was a US Army officer known as the "Father of the Modern Quartermaster Corps." His military career spanned 52 years, starting in the War of 1812 and ending after 42 years as Quartermaster General. In 1836, President Andrew Jackson detached him from his title as Quartermaster General. First, to deal with the Creek tribe in Georgia and Alabama and then to assume command of all U.S. troops in Florida during the Second Seminole War.

William Lauderdale is the namesake of Fort Lauderdale.

Sam Jones was the spiritual medicine and war chief of the Miccosukee and Seminole people during the Second and Third Seminole Wars.

Battlefield today
The exact location of both battlefields was unclear for most of the 20th century. At one time it was incorrectly identified as having taken place in modern Jonathan Dickinon State Park, with a marker placed there accordingly. In the 1980s, numerous avocational archaeologists, not all of them working together, concluded Jesup's battle occurred in Jupiter Farms along the Loxahatchee River Northwest Fork around and south of Indiantown Road (SR 706). An extensive archaeological survey by professional archaeologist Robert S. Carr and his Archaeological and Historical Conservancy (AHC) confirmed the location of the battlefield as well as numerous Seminole and pre-Seminole archaeological sites in Riverbend Park. The part of the park where the battle took place is now Loxahatchee River Battlefield Park. The park is managed by Palm Beach County Parks and Recreation.

The exact location of Powell's Battle is less clear, but probably occurred east of Riverbend Park.

Starting in 2017, the Loxahatchee Battlefield Preservationists (LBP) have held an annual battle reenactment in late January.

See also
List of battles won by Indigenous peoples of the Americas
West Indies Squadron

Notes

References

External links
 Loxahatchee Battlefield Preservationists
 Florida State Historical Marker - Powell's Battle
 Florida State Historical Marker - Jesup's Battle
 Levin M. Powell Biography

1838 in the United States
Loxahatchee River
Loxahatchee River
Loxahatchee River
January 1838 events